Carey Isom Selph (December 5, 1901 – February 24, 1976) was a professional baseball infielder. He played two seasons in Major League Baseball.

He was soon acquired by the St. Louis Cardinals, and finished the season with the Syracuse Chiefs. In 25 games, Selph played mostly as a second baseman, batting .235.

After two seasons back in the minor leagues with the Buffaloes, Selph was drafted from the Cardinals by the Chicago White Sox on September 30, 1931 in the Rule 5 draft. He played 116 games for the White Sox in 1932, mostly at third base, batting .283 with 51 RBI. After the season, he was traded back to the Cardinals and never played in the majors again. He played two more seasons with the Buffaloes, serving as a player-manager for them in 1933-34.

References

Sources

 Carey Selph at SABR (Baseball BioProject)

Major League Baseball third basemen
Major League Baseball second basemen
St. Louis Cardinals players
Chicago White Sox players
Fort Smith Twins players
Syracuse Chiefs players
Houston Buffaloes managers
Houston Buffaloes players
Baseball players from Arkansas
1901 births
1976 deaths
Ouachita Baptist Tigers baseball players